Ishey (İşäy) is a rural locality (a selo) in Temyasovsky Selsoviet, Baymaksky District, Bashkortostan, Russia. The population was 326 as of 2010. There are 10 streets.

Geography 
Ishey is located 79 km northwest of Baymak (the district's administrative centre) by road. Beterya is the nearest rural locality.

References 

Rural localities in Baymaksky District